Juan de Borgoña (c. 1470–1536), was a High Renaissance painter who was born in the Duchy of Burgundy, probably just before it ceased to exist as an independent state, and was active in Spain from about 1495 to 1536.  His earliest documented work was painted in 1495 for the cloister of the Cathedral of Toledo.  Borgoña’s compositions are well balanced with finely drawn figures in elegant, tranquil poses.  They are set either against open spaces leading on to craggy landscapes or against gold embroidered drapery. There were a number of foreign painters active in Spain in this period, including Juan de Flandes.  He brought the Quattrocento form of paintings into Castile.

He is not to be confused with another painter Joan de Burgunya or Borgunya who was active in Catalonia between 1510 and 1525.

Borgoña’s students include Pedro de Cisneros the Elder (died 1546), Antonio de Comontes (ca. 1500-1519), Juan Correa de Vivar (ca. 1510-1566) and Borgoña’s own son Juan de Borgoña the younger (ca. 1550-1565).

References
Smith, Virginia Carlson, Juan de Borgoña and His School, Los Angeles, Hennessey & Ingalls, 1973.
Museo del Prado, Catálogo de las pinturas, 1996, p. 33, Ministerio de Educación y Cultura, Madrid, No ISBN
The Grove Dictionary of Art, Macmillan Publishers Limited, 2000.
Sánchez Rivera, Jesús Ángel, Las pinturas de Juan de Borgoña en la sala capitular de la catedral de Toledo. Aproximación crítica a su historiografía, Anales toledanos, no. 40 (2004), p. 149-164.

External links
Obras de Juan de Borgoña 
 Biography at the Museo del Prado online encyclopedia 

1470s births
15th-century French painters
French male painters
16th-century French painters
15th-century Spanish painters
Spanish male painters
16th-century Spanish painters
Renaissance painters
Spanish Renaissance painters
1534 deaths